The American Chestnut Foundation (TACF) is a nonprofit American organization dedicated to breeding a blight-resistant American chestnut (Castanea dentata) tree and the reintroduction of this tree to the forests of the Eastern United States.

The mission of The American Chestnut Foundation (TACF) is to restore the American chestnut tree to the forests of Eastern North America by breeding genetically diverse blight-resistant trees, evaluating various approaches to the management of chestnut pests and pathogens, and reintroducing the trees into the forest in an ecologically acceptable manner.  The American chestnut tree once comprised a quarter of the eastern hardwood forest from Maine to Georgia and west to the Ohio River Valley, providing a valuable economic resource in both timber and nuts, as well as an abundant food source for wildlife. An accidentally imported Asiatic chestnut blight decimated approximately four billion trees, with devastating results to Appalachian communities and economies.

TACF's work is accomplished by the combination of a small professional staff and a large group of volunteers associated with sixteen state chapters from Maine to Georgia/Alabama and west to the Ohio River Valley.  Chapters leverage TACF's efforts by organizing volunteers to identify surviving American chestnuts, pollinate these survivors with pollen from TACF's Meadowview Research Farms station in Virginia, and establish and maintain local breeding nurseries. These nurseries expect to eventually produce blight-resistant trees adapted to local conditions throughout the original range.  The requirements for both genetic diversity and regional adaptability were the key factors in the establishment of the state chapter breeding programs manned by volunteers.  A strength of TACF has been its ability to develop effective partnerships with other organizations leading to the advancement of the science relative to developing a blight-resistant tree. TACF has many cooperators involved in chestnut study and restoration, among them university partnerships, the National Wild Turkey Federation, and the US Forest Service.

The American Chestnut Foundation differs from the American Chestnut Cooperators Foundation, which is attempting to re-establish the species using pure American chestnut genetic stock.

TACF was founded in 1983 by a group of prominent plant scientists, including Nobel Prize-winning plant breeder Norman Borlaug; Peter Raven, Director of the Missouri Botanical Garden; independent chestnut researcher Philip Rutter; and the late Charles Burnham, a Minnesota corn geneticist. In 1989 TACF established the Wagner Research Farm, a breeding station in Meadowview, in southwestern Virginia, to execute the backcross breeding program. A second research farm in Meadowview was donated to TACF in 1995, and a third Meadowview farm was purchased in 2002.

In 2007, TACF began harvesting nuts that it expects will be suitable for planting back into the forest. However, these breeding lines are still in the testing phase, and their value needs to be proven on many forest sites until 2015 to 2020.  One group of highly backcrossed blight-resistant chestnuts produced by the organization is 15/16 (ca. 94%) American chestnut (Castanea dentata) and 1/16 (ca. 6%) Chinese chestnut (Castanea mollissima), a source of blight resistance.

A gradual increase in TACF seed production is expected over the next few years. These will be distributed to cooperators who are assisting in a formal, rigorous testing program. In addition, seeds that are not needed for this purpose will be distributed for informal testing, principally to members of TACF. At the same time, TACF is continuing its breeding program to make further gains in disease resistance and forest competitiveness.

References

 The American Chestnut Foundation

This set of PDFs of The Journal of the American Chestnut Foundation, from 1985 to 2008 so far, provides the definitive history of the organization:
http://ecosystems.psu.edu/research/chestnut/information/journal

Environmental organizations based in the United States
Organizations established in 1983
Horticultural organizations based in the United States
1983 establishments in the United States